In an organ, "Swell" (German: "Schwellwerk;" French: "Récit") refers to the division whose pipes are enclosed in a swell box.  This box has a large opening covered with moveable shades or shutters which resemble heavy venetian blinds.  When open, these shutters allow the pipes' sounds to travel freely from the box to the room.  When closed, most of the sound is contained in the box.  Thus the moveable shades provide a means of adjusting the loudness of the sound, and perhaps more importantly, of gradual crescendo ("swelling") and decrescendo.

This arrangement is necessary because a given pipe only plays at one given loudness.  If the wind pressure were varied in an attempt to change the loudness, the pitch, tone quality, attack and decay and other characteristics would also change.  In fact, organ builders have to go to a lot of trouble to provide a steady, unchanging wind supply.  So the only way to gradually increase or decrease the loudness of a pipe is to enclose it in a swell box, and then to gradually open or close the shutters.

This has its drawbacks.  No matter how a swell box is designed, the sound of the pipes is compromised by enclosing them.  Since much organ repertoire was written before gradual crescendo and decrescendo effects became common, this seems to represent an unnecessary degradation of early music.  The kinds of music which are least compatible with enclosed pipes are precisely the kinds where gradual crescendo and diminuendo are not required.  On the other hand, building an organ with no swell box – and thus unable to play later music – would also limit the instrument's usefulness.

The usual way of dealing with this problem is to build an organ in which the pipes are divided into several sections or divisions, one or more of which are enclosed in a swell box or boxes, the other divisions remaining unenclosed.

History 
The invention of the swell box has been credited to two organ-builders called Abraham Jordan, a father-and-son team which was active in the early eighteenth century (for example at the church of St Magnus-the-Martyr, London). It took time to be adopted in other countries and therefore some of the best organ music, for example that of Bach, was not written with a swell box in mind. 

The Jordans´ work can be seen as a development of earlier technology, but its significance was recognised at the time. The Spectator announced that "Whereas Mr Abraham Jordan, senior and junior, have, with their own hands, joinery excepted, made and erected a very large organ in St Magnus' Church, at the foot of London Bridge, consisting of four sets of keys, one of which is adapted to the art of emitting sounds by swelling notes, which never was in any organ before; this instrument will be publicly opened on Sunday next [14 February 1712], the performance by Mr John Robinson. The above-said Abraham Jordan gives notice to all masters and performers, that he will attend every day next week at the said Church, to accommodate all those gentlemen who shall have a curiosity to hear it".

Aristide Cavaillé-Coll refined the English swell box by devising a spring-loaded (later balanced) pedal with which the organist could operate the swell shutters.

References 

Pipe organ components